= Reggae Release =

Reggae Release is a registered Digital Content Distribution company based in Kingston, Jamaica, mainly focusing on reggae/dancehall music.

Reggae Release partners with traditional distributors, producers and sale agents, managing all aspects of digital distribution, strategy and marketing, on the leading digital service providers in North America, Europe and the rest of the world.

In 2015, Reggae Release partnered with The World Nature Organization (WNO) and reggae artist Andre "Nature Ellis" to create and launch the official WNO song, the “World Nature Song”. The song was created to draw a more focused attention on the plights affecting the planet, especially developing and emerging countries.
